The women's 800 metre freestyle event at the 2014 Commonwealth Games as part of the swimming programme took place on 27 and 28 July at the Tollcross International Swimming Centre in Glasgow, Scotland.

The medals were presented by Robert Smith, Baron Smith of Kelvin, Chairman of Glasgow 2014 and the quaichs were presented by Kenn Banks, President of the Commonwealth Games Association of Anguilla.

Records
Prior to this competition, the existing world and Commonwealth Games records were as follows.

The following records were established during the competition:

Results

Heats

Second reserve swim-off

Final

References

External links

Women's 800 metre freestyle
Commonwealth Games
2014 in women's swimming